Mohammad Azharullah (born 25 December 1983) is an English Pakistani cricketer, who most recently played in England for Northamptonshire. Azharullah is a right-arm fast-medium bowler who also bats right-handed.

Career in Pakistan
Azharullah made his first-class cricket debut for Multan in December 2004 against Karachi Whites.

He played 49 first-class matches in Pakistan between the 2004–05 and 2009–10 seasons, together with another four in the 2012–13 season, for
Baluchistan, Multan, Punjab, Quetta and Water and Power Development Authority. During this time he took 190 first-class wickets at an average of 26.62. His most prolific season was 2007–08, when he took 52 wickets for Water and Power Development Authority and Baluchistan.

Northants career
In 2009 Azharullah married an English woman and played league cricket in Yorkshire with the intention of later playing county cricket.

Azharullah signed for Northants for the 2013 season and he made an immediate impact, especially in the Twenty20 competition. He took the most wickets in the competition that year, with 27 at 12.62 and played in the final, against Surrey He has continued to be a regular in the Northants team in all three forms of the game and his initial one-year contract was renewed once, and further extended to last until 2017. He has returned twice to Twenty20 finals day, Northants finishing runners-up in 2015, and beating Durham in the 2016 final.

References

External links
 

1983 births
Living people
Pakistani cricketers
Cricketers from Burewala
Northamptonshire cricketers
Multan cricketers
Water and Power Development Authority cricketers
Baluchistan cricketers
Quetta cricketers
Quetta Bears cricketers
Punjab (Pakistan) cricketers
Pakistani emigrants to the United Kingdom
British people of Punjabi descent
Naturalised citizens of the United Kingdom
English cricketers
British Asian cricketers
British sportspeople of Pakistani descent